Johannes Nyman (28 April 1893 in Harku Parish, Harju County – 19 February 1966 in Stockholm) was an Estonian politician. He was a member of VI Riigikogu (its Chamber of Deputies).

References

1893 births
1966 deaths
Members of the Riigivolikogu